Ronald Herbert Mason (January 14, 1940 – June 13, 2016) was a Canadian ice hockey player, head coach, and university executive. A head coach of various American universities, most notably Michigan State University (MSU), he was the most successful coach in NCAA ice hockey history between 1993 and 2012 with 924 wins, until Jerry York (Boston College) become the new winningest coach with his 925th career win on December 29, 2012. Mason was athletic director at MSU from 2002 to 2008. He then served as senior advisor for the USHL Muskegon Lumberjacks. On December 2, 2013, Mason was inducted into the United States Hockey Hall of Fame.

Family 
Ron Mason was born the son of Harvey Mason, a salesman, and Agnes Mackay Mason, an elementary school teacher. He married the former Marion Bell on June 8, 1963. They had two daughters, Tracey (born 1963) and Cindy (born 1968) and two grandsons, Tyler and Travis. Travis was a defenseman on the Michigan State University hockey team until his graduation in 2016. Mason had one sister, Marion Mason Rowe.

Education 
Mason earned a B.A. in physical education from St. Lawrence University in 1964 and a Masters in physical education from the University of Pittsburgh in 1965. Michigan State University awarded Mason an honorary doctorate in 2001.

Career as player 
Mason played junior hockey with the Ontario Hockey Association’s Peterborough Petes and the Ottawa Junior Canadians. From there Mason enrolled at St. Lawrence University in the upstate town of Canton, New York where he lettered in hockey for three years. In his first season at SLU in 1960–61, Mason and the Skating Saints were NCAA national finalists. In 1961–62, Mason and SLU won the school's first Eastern College Athletic Conference championship and made the NCAA Frozen Four. In his final season, SLU won a school-record 20 games finishing 20–6–1. Mason lead the team in scoring twice earning back-to-back first-team all league honors. Mason was St. Lawrence's only player to earn that distinction until T. J. Trevelyan was named all league in 2005 and 2006.

Career as coach 
Mason coached one NAIA program, Lake Superior State, and two NCAA programs, Bowling Green State and Michigan State in 36 seasons from 1966 to 2002. He won two national titles: NAIA in 1972 with Lake Superior State and NCAA in 1986 with Michigan State. Ron Mason finished his coaching career as the all-time career victories leader in college hockey history with 924 wins. Boston College's Jerry York surpassed Mason's win total on December 31, 2012. Mason is also the career coaching victories leader at Michigan State with 635 wins. He is Bowling Green State's winningest coach by percentage winning over 71 percent of his 229 games at BGSU.

Mason had 33 seasons with a winning record, 30 seasons winning 20 or more games and 11 seasons winning 30 or more games. Mason won ten CCHA regular season championships and a record 13 CCHA tournament titles. He advanced his teams to the NCAA tournament 22 times—six times as the No. 1 seed—making the Frozen Four eight times. Mason was the CCHA coach of the year six times. He won the Spencer Penrose Memorial Trophy as the national coach of the year in 1992.

On January 26, 2002, a media report stated Mason would step down as coach at Michigan State to take over the athletic director position at MSU. On January 28, 2002, Mason made it official he would leave his post as head ice hockey coach to become athletic director.

Lake Superior State
Mason started the hockey program at Lake Superior State University in 1966. In seven seasons at LSSU he produced four 20-win seasons and never lost more than 10 games. He guided the Lakers to the 1972 National Association of Intercollegiate Athletics (NAIA) national championship.

Bowling Green State
In 1973 he moved to Bowling Green State University where he won three Central Collegiate Hockey Association regular season titles and three consecutive CCHA tournament titles in six seasons. In 1977 Bowling Green State earned their first berth in the NCAA tournament. The berth was a first for a team not from the Western Collegiate Hockey Association or Eastern Collegiate Athletic Conference in the NCAA tournament's 30 year history. It was the first of three consecutive NCAA tournaments under Mason. BGSU won the third-place game over defending national champion Wisconsin in the 1978 NCAA Frozen Four. In 1978–79 Mason coached BGSU to a then NCAA record 37 wins. The record would be broken in 1984-85 by Mason's own Michigan State team.

Michigan State
Michigan State University Athletic Director Joseph Kearney hired Mason to replace the retiring Amo Bessone on April 1, 1979. In his third season at MSU, Mason guided Michigan State to their first NCAA tournament in 15 seasons. Four seasons later in 1986, Mason led Michigan State to the school's second national title. Michigan State returned to the championship game the following season but lost to North Dakota. On March 12, 1993, with a 6-5 win over Kent State, Mason passed former Boston College coach Len Ceglarski to become college hockey's all-time winningest coach with 674 wins. While at MSU, Mason won a conference-record 10 CCHA tournament championships, including a conference-record four straight from 1982 to 1985. In addition, MSU under Mason won seven CCHA regular season titles, earned 19 NCAA tournament appearances, and earned seven NCAA Frozen Four appearances.

Career as athletic director 
Ron Mason began his duties as athletic director on July 1, 2002. Before he officially became athletic director, Mason chose Rick Comley as his successor as hockey coach.

On November 4, 2002, after a disappointing season and a series of off-the-field incidents with players, Mason fired head football coach Bobby Williams with three games left in the season and eventually hired  John L. Smith away from Louisville as his permanent replacement. Mason fired Smith after three consecutive losing seasons, and Mason then hired Mark Dantonio away from Cincinnati, who brought the Spartans to football prominence.

While athletic director, the Michigan State hockey team won the school's third national title in 2007. Mason is the only person to have won NCAA ice hockey titles as head coach and athletic director.  Mason also placed a priority seat licensing program in Spartan Stadium based on years of holding season tickets, contribution to the Ralph Young Fund, and a licensing fee for better seats on top of the price of season tickets. Further updates to increase revenue in Spartan Stadium included a $64 million USD expansion and improvements which include:
24 luxury suites
800 club seats
The "Grand Entrance" featuring high ceilings, glass walls, marble floors and a new home for the original Sparty statue
 luxury concourse
Office space for Career Services, University Advancement and the MSU Alumni Office
State of the art recruiting lounge
Upgraded stadium-wide bathroom and concourse renovations
An increase of 3000 seats, bringing the total stadium capacity to 75,005

In September 2006, Michigan State University's Board of Trustees approved a contract extension for Mason extending his contract as MSU's athletic director through June 2008. He retired from the post of athletic director at Michigan State University on January 1, 2008, and was succeeded by Mark Hollis.

Legacy with the CCHA 
In addition to his success as a coach, Mason was involved in organizing the Central Collegiate Hockey Association (CCHA) and helping it to grow into one of the most powerful college hockey conferences of the 1980s, '90s, and 2000s. When Mason began coaching in 1966 there were only two major conferences in the NCAA, the Eastern College Athletic Conference and the Western Collegiate Hockey Association. While building the ice hockey program at Lake Superior State to Division I status, Mason found that his team was left without a conference. In 1972 Mason, along with Bowling Green State University's Jack Vivian, St. Louis University's Bill Selman, Ohio State University's Dave Chambers, Ohio University's John McComb and the CCHA's first commissioner Fred Jacoby, formed the Central Collegiate Hockey Association. Mason's coaching tenure at Bowling Green State produced the CCHA's first NCAA tournament berth, first appearance in the NCAA Frozen Four, and first national No. 1 ranking.

For his contributions in helping build the CCHA, the conference renamed their tournament championship trophy as the Mason Cup in 2000–01.

Philanthropy 
Mason volunteered with the Sparrow Foundation where he established the Ron Mason Fund for Pediatric Rehabilitation which helps children with disabilities. The fund has raised $675,000 for the foundation since 1998. He was also honorary chairperson for the Children's Miracle Network which has raised $19 million plus since 1989.

Death
Mason died on the morning of June 13, 2016 in Haslett, Michigan after suffering a heart attack. He was 76.

Notable players coached 
In his 36 years, Mason coached a number of outstanding players.

Hobey Baker Award winners

Hobey Baker Award finalists

AHCA All-America

CCHA Player of the Year

NHL first round draft picks

Joe Murphy was first NCAA player selected first overall

Select NHL players

Olympians

Head coaching record

See also
List of college men's ice hockey coaches with 400 wins

Awards and honors

References

External links

1940 births
2016 deaths
Bowling Green Falcons ice hockey coaches
Ice hockey people from Ontario
Lake Superior State Lakers men's ice hockey coaches
Michigan State Spartans athletic directors
Michigan State Spartans ice hockey coaches
People from Huron County, Ontario
Peterborough Petes (ice hockey) players
St. Lawrence Saints men's ice hockey players
United Hockey League coaches
University of Pittsburgh alumni